Paul R. Norby (May 16, 1913 – October 3, 2015) was a rear admiral in the United States Naval Reserve. He entered service in 1939 and retired in 1973. He later served as a postmaster of Mabel, Minnesota.

References

1913 births
2015 deaths
American centenarians
Men centenarians
United States Navy admirals
Minnesota postmasters
People from Madison, Minnesota
People from Mabel, Minnesota
People from Wayzata, Minnesota
Military personnel from Minnesota
United States Navy personnel of World War II